Sir Edward Cholmley Dering, 8th Baronet (19 November 1807 – 1 April 1896) was a British Liberal Party politician.

He was born the only son of Edward Dering of Barham, Kent and Henrietta, the daughter and coheiress of Richard Nevill of Furness, County Kildare and educated at Harrow school (1821–24) and Christ Church, Oxford (1827). He succeeded his father when only an infant in 1808 and his grandfather Sir Edward Dering, 7th Baronet of Surrenden Dering as the 8th baronet on 30 June 1811.

He entered Parliament as the MP for Wexford Borough in 1830 and 1831, followed by New Romney in 1831 and Kent East from 1852 to 1857 and 1863 to 1868. He was High Sheriff of Kent for 1836–37.

He married in 1832, the Hon. Jane Edwardes, daughter of William Edwardes, 2nd Baron Kensington  and had 6 sons and a daughter. He was succeeded in the baronetcy by his son Sir Henry Dering, 9th Baronet.

References

External links 
 

1807 births
1896 deaths
People educated at Harrow School
Alumni of Christ Church, Oxford
Baronets in the Baronetage of England
Liberal Party (UK) MPs for English constituencies
Conservative Party (UK) MPs for English constituencies
Members of the Parliament of the United Kingdom for County Wexford constituencies (1801–1922)
Tory MPs (pre-1834)
UK MPs 1830–1831
UK MPs 1831–1832
UK MPs 1852–1857
UK MPs 1857–1859
UK MPs 1859–1865
UK MPs 1865–1868
High Sheriffs of Kent